St. Anthony, also known as Saint Anthony Village, is a city in Hennepin and Ramsey counties in the U.S. state of Minnesota. At the 2010 census the population was 8,226, of whom 5,156 lived in the larger Hennepin County part of the city and 3,070 in the Ramsey County part. The city is run by a five-member council consisting of a mayor and four council members who serve four-year terms.

History

St. Anthony's origins date to 1838, when Franklin Steele, a storekeeper at Fort Snelling, made a claim on the land east of St. Anthony Falls. Steele did not begin developing the land until 1848, but it quickly became a center of milling and trade much like the neighboring town of Minneapolis on the land west of the falls. In 1858 the town was formally organized as the Township of St. Anthony.

In 1872, Minneapolis annexed most of St. Anthony (much of present-day Northeast Minneapolis). Roughly  of mostly agricultural land north of the city retained the name St. Anthony but remained unincorporated. In 1945, the township's residents voted 167–57 in favor of incorporating as a village. The state challenged this decision on the basis that St. Anthony was too agricultural and rural, but it was upheld by the Minnesota Supreme Court. As the city's suburbs grew outward, St. Anthony evolved from a rural township to an inner suburb.

St. Anthony was the home of Apache Plaza, the tenth indoor shopping mall in United States, which opened in October 1961. The oldest, Southdale, lay only  to the south and was completed in October 1956. Built in the 1950s, the St. Anthony Shopping Center was Minnesota's first strip mall and was owned by the Batista family of Cuba.

In the spring of 2006, the St. Anthony Village High School Huskies claimed ISD 282's first state baseball championship. The Huskies won the championship again in 2008. The school has also won five Class AA state championships in Knowledge Bowl and has won one Minnesota Science Bowl competition.

Geography

One of St. Anthony's longest and most widely used streets is Silver Lake Road. Named for Silver Lake in the northwest part of the city, it runs the length of St. Anthony from north to south. County Highway 88 is another of the city's main routes. Interstate 35W skims through the south near the St. Anthony Boulevard exit.

Demographics

2010 census
As of the 2010 census, there were 8,226 people, 3,848 households, and 2,054 families residing in the city. The racial makeup of the city was 85.1% White, 5.0% African American, 0.6% Native American, 5.9% Asian, 0.1% Pacific Islander, 1.0% from other races, and 2.3% from two or more races. Hispanic or Latino of any race were 2.9% of the population.

There were 3,848 households, of which 21.5% had children under the age of 18 living with them, 42.5% were married couples living together, 7.7% had a female householder with no husband present, 3.2% had a male householder with no wife present, and 46.6% were non-families. 39.3% of all households were made up of individuals, and 19.2% had someone living alone who was 65 years of age or older. The average household size was 2.11 and the average family size was 2.83.

The median age in the city was 43.1 years. 17.5% of residents were under the age of 18; 8.5% were between the ages of 18 and 24; 26.1% were from 25 to 44; 26.4% were from 45 to 64; and 21.4% were 65 years of age or older. The gender makeup of the city was 46.1% male and 53.9% female.

2000 census
As of the 2000 census, there were 8,012 people, 3,697 households, and 2,007 families residing in the city. The racial makeup of the city was 90.58% White, 2.06% African American, 0.64% Native American, 4.51% Asian, 0.02% Pacific Islander, 0.79% from other races, and 1.41% from two or more races. Hispanic or Latino of any race were 1.65% of the population. 20.5% were of German, 12.6% Norwegian, 10.5% Swedish, 8.7% Polish and 6.3% Irish ancestry.

There were 3,697 households, out of which 20.0% had children under the age of 18 living with them, 44.7% were married couples living together, 7.0% had a female householder with no husband present, and 45.7% were non-families. 38.2% of all households were made up of individuals, and 18.5% had someone living alone who was 65 years of age or older.  The average household size was 2.11 and the average family size was 2.83.

In the city, the population was spread out, with 18.0% under the age of 18, 8.9% from 18 to 24, 26.2% from 25 to 44, 21.9% from 45 to 64, and 25.1% who were 65 years of age or older.  The median age was 43 years. For every 100 females, there were 85.2 males.  For every 100 females age 18 and over, there were 79.5 males.

The median income for a household in the city was $46,883, and the median income for a family was $62,500. Males had a median income of $43,043 versus $31,304 for females. The per capita income for the city was $26,290.  About 2.8% of families and 5.1% of the population were below the poverty line, including 5.0% of those under age 18 and 3.0% of those age 65 or over.

Education

St. Anthony is served by the St. Anthony-New Brighton School District, ISD 282. Wilshire Park Elementary School is the district's primary school. St. Anthony Middle School serves grades 6–8. St. Anthony Village High School serves grades 9–12. St. Charles Borromeo offers private education for grades K–8.

Parks and recreation
St. Anthony has several city parks. The most notable is Central Park, in the center of the city near the High School and Community Center, as well as the police station, fire station and water treatment plant. Several of the high school's athletic teams host home competitions in Central Park. Smaller parks include Emerald Park, Silver Point Park, and Trillium Park. St. Anthony also has a golf course maintained by the Minneapolis Parks and Recreation Board and a county park, Silverwood, maintained by the Three Rivers Park District. Silverwood Park is on Silver Lake, which is almost entirely within St. Anthony's boundaries.

Sister city
St. Anthony Village has one sister city, as designated by Sister Cities International:

 Salo, Finland

St. Anthony dedicated Salo Park to its sister city on June 8, 2006, in its Silver Lake Village development.

See also
 H. Timothy ("Tim") Vakoc, former associate pastor of St. Charles Borromeo Catholic Church in St. Anthony, and the first U.S. military chaplain to die from wounds received in the Iraq War
 Shooting of Philando Castile

References

External links
 Saint Anthony Village official website

Cities in Hennepin County, Minnesota
Cities in Ramsey County, Minnesota
Cities in Minnesota
1861 establishments in Minnesota
Populated places established in 1861